Milica Mićović (Serbian Cyrillic: Милица Мићовић, born 24 August 1984 in Mladenovac, SFR Yugoslavia) is a Serbian female basketball player.

External links
Profile at eurobasket.com

1984 births
Living people
Basketball players from Belgrade
Serbian expatriate basketball people in Italy
Serbian women's basketball players
Shooting guards
Small forwards